Manhattan Cocktail (1928) was a part-talkie film, directed by Dorothy Arzner, and starring Nancy Carroll, Richard Arlen, and Lilyan Tashman. At the time this movie was made, Hollywood was already making the transition of silent to sound, either making all talking movies, part talking movies, or silent movies with their own soundtrack and sound effects.

Preservation status
Manhattan Cocktail is a lost film except for a one-minute montage sequence, "Skyline Dance" by Slavko Vorkapich, which was released in October 2005 on the DVD Unseen Cinema: Early American Avant Garde Film 1894–1941.

Songs 
"Gotta Be Good" by Victor Schertzinger
"Another Kiss" by Victor Schertzinger

References

External links
Manhattan Cocktail at IMDB
Manhattan Cocktail at SilentEra

Films directed by Dorothy Arzner
1928 films
American silent feature films
Paramount Pictures films
Lost American films
Transitional sound films
American black-and-white films
1928 drama films
Silent American drama films
1928 lost films
Lost drama films
1920s English-language films
1920s American films